The Lusatian Highlands or Lusatian Hills (Upper Sorbian: Łužiske hory) form a hilly region in Germany and the Czech Republic. A western extension of the Sudetes range, it is located on the border of the German state of Saxony with the Czech Bohemian region. It is one of the eight natural landscapes of Upper Lusatia.

The Lusatian Highlands are named after the historic region of Upper Lusatia, while the southern Czech portion is also known as the Šluknov Hook. The hills are situated between the Elbe Sandstone Mountains to the west and the somewhat higher Lusatian Mountains and the Zittau Mountains to the east. The source of the river Spree, which runs through central Berlin, is located near the small town of Ebersbach.

The Lusatian Highlands are a famous tourist region that is portrayed in several movies. They are known for the beauty of the landscape and their picturesque towns with Baroque churches and wooden houses. Popular tourist towns in the region are Schirgiswalde, also known as the capital of carnival in Upper Lusatia, Šluknov with its famous arboretum, and Rumburk with medieval old town centre. Other notable towns include Ebersbach, Velký Šenov, Neukirch/Lausitz, Sohland an der Spree and Kirschau.

See also 
 List of regions of Saxony
 Lusatian Mountains

References 

 
Regions of Saxony
Natural regions of Saxony
Hill ranges of Germany
Landforms of Saxony
Sudetes
Upper Lusatia
Mountain ranges of the Czech Republic
Highlands